Army/Navy Transportable Pulse-Radar Search-32 (AN/TPS-32) was a three-dimensional, tactical long-range surveillance radar operated by the United States Marine Corps from the early 1970s through the early 1990s.  Developed by ITT Gilfillan in Van Nuys, California, the radar was the primary sensor for the Marine Corps' Tactical Air Operations Center (TAOC) and was optimized to work in concert with the MIM-23 Hawk Missile System and the Marine Tactical Data System.

Development
Development of the AN/TPS-32 began with the United States Navy's Bureau of Ships in the 1950s.  It was meant to be a next generation, mobile radar capable of supporting Marine Corps forces during amphibious operations.  

The TPS-32 was a major improvement in radar technology for the Marine Corps.  It was the service's second three dimensional radar providing range, azimuth and altitude from one array thus precluding the need for a separate Height-finder radar.  Unlike the old mechanically scanned arrays that utilized analog technology, the TPS-32 was 90% digital, solid-state electronics possessing a phased Antenna array.  Also new for the design of this radar was the use of three crossed-field amplifiers as the microwave amplifiers in the very-high-power transmitter. They replaced the cavity magnetrons utilized on earlier radar sets.

The AN/TPS-32 was delivered to Marine Air Control Squadron 3 (MACS-3) in 1969 for final operational testing.  MACS-3 was re-designated as the Marine Corps Tactical Systems Support Activity (MCTSSA) in 1970 and continued testing.  The radar entered service in the Fleet Marine Force in 1972.

In the 1980s, the Marine Corps began to seek a replacement for both the AN/TPS-32 and MTDS.  Development continued throughout the 1980s at Marine Air Control Squadron 1 (MACS-1).  Following the Gulf War, the TPS-32 was replaced in the Marine Corps inventory by the AN/TPS-59.

Units that utilized the TPS-32
 MACS-2
 MACS-4
 MACS-5
 MACS-6
 MACS-7
 MACS-24
 Marine Corps Tactical Systems Support Activity

See also
 United States Marine Corps aviation
 List of United States Marine Corps aviation support units

Citations

References

Ground radars
United States Marine Corps equipment
Military radars of the United States
Military radars of the United States Marine Corps
Military equipment introduced in the 1960s